is a Japanese manga series written and illustrated by Taku Kawamura. It has been serialized in Square Enix's shōnen manga magazine Monthly Gangan Joker since May 2018, with its chapters collected in thirteen tankōbon volumes as of November 2022. An anime television series adaptation by Studio Signpost is set to premiere in April 2023.

Characters

Media

Manga
My Clueless First Friend, written and illustrated by Taku Kawamura, started in Square Enix's shōnen manga magazine Monthly Gangan Joker on May 22, 2018. Square Enix has collected its chapters into individual tankōbon volumes. The first volume was released on October 22, 2018. As of November 22, 2022, thirteen volumes have been released.

In July 2022, Square Enix Manga & Books announced that they had licensed the manga for English released in North America. The series is also published online on the English version of Square Enix's Manga UP! platform since July 2022.

Volume list

Anime
In November 2022, it was announced that the manga will receive an anime television series adaptation. It is produced by Studio Signpost and directed by Shigenori Kageyama, with scripts written by Takafumi Hoshikawa and Shogo Yasukawa, character designs handled by Chikashi Kadekaru, and music composed by Toshio Masuda. The series is set to premiere on April 9, 2023, on Tokyo MX and other networks. The opening theme song, is performed by Reina Kondō, while the ending theme song, is performed by Kitri. Crunchyroll licensed the series outside of Asia.

References

External links
  
  
 

2023 anime television series debuts
Anime series based on manga
Comedy anime and manga
Crunchyroll anime
Gangan Comics manga
Shōnen manga
Slice of life anime and manga
Studio Signpost
Tokyo MX original programming